Lili Bontemps (1921–1979) was a French actress and singer. She played a number of sex symbol roles in postwar French cinema and also posed as a pin-up.

Selected filmography
 The Convict (1951)
 Au diable la vertu (1953)
 Naked in the Wind (1953)
 Love at Sea (1964)

References

Bibliography
 Ogrizek, Doré. Paris. McGraw-Hill, 1955.
 Schmid, Marion. Intermedial Dialogues: The French New Wave and the Other Arts. Edinburgh University Press, 2019.

External links

1921 births
1979 deaths
French actresses
French singers
People from Landes (department)